The Pure Heroine Tour was the inaugural concert tour by New Zealand singer-songwriter Lorde, in support of her debut studio album, Pure Heroine (2013). Her first performance was at the Splendour in the Grass music festival as a last-minute replacement for Frank Ocean. Before the tour, Lorde performed at small nightclubs and bars around New Zealand and Australia. North American shows were announced in August 2013, followed by a series of dates in Oceania. Dates in Europe and South America soon followed.

The show consisted of three segments and three costume changes. With the exception of a couple of covers, the set list included only songs from her debut album. Typically, Lorde appeared on stage hidden from the crowd, visible only in silhouette. She also premiered an unreleased song called "Good Fights". An alternate set list with minor changes was performed after the first North American leg of the tour. The show was met with critical acclaim, with critics complimenting the singer's vocal clarity and stage presence, as well as the minimalist stage setting.

Background

Lorde's first major show was at Splendour in the Grass on 28 July 2013, where she served as a last-minute replacement for Frank Ocean, who had to cancel his appearance at the Australian music festival. Before this show, Lorde had performed only five public shows in small nightclubs and bars in New Zealand and Australia. On 7 August 2013, Lorde announced North American tour dates to support her debut album Pure Heroine (2013); Australian dates were announced two weeks later. Lorde premiered an unreleased song called "Good Fights" at a limited number of shows.

In an interview with Fuse, Lorde described the tour as "beautiful" and "stylized" with several costume changes. She declined an opening act spot for Katy Perry, saying it is important for an artist to establish themselves. "I'm just basically really stubborn and I want to be really independent. So I want to be headlining my own shows instead of supporting someone else."

Lorde prepared three segments of her show, demonstrating to American audiences the areas where she grew up, saying:
I had this idea I wanted it to be divided into three parts. The first part would be kind of my home and my life before everything happened to me, and be really suburban-feeling. I have these street lamps that are on stage with me, I very much wanted to anchor it in that world. And we went around and filmed in my town, and the jetty where I sit every day in summer, and the white tunnel you drive through going from Auckland to the Shore ... I got them to film in that tunnel, I wanted it to be of my world. And to be showing these American audiences, this is actually my spot. ... And then the concept ... goes into my head and dreams, and all the kind of abstract emotions you have when you are embarking on something like this. And the third section is the present day ... It's three quite clear acts. And that first one was all about home.

Development
In an interview with Christopher Holder of AudioTechnology, James Mac, a keyboardist for Lorde, mentioned that he used two  MacBook Pros installed with music software Ableton Live as part of the sound stage. Joel Little also arranged samples that were programmed with two Novation 61-key impulses. The pads on the impulse control "vocal samples, sirens, etc." while the keys play "drum racks on Ableton, or soft synths from the Arturia synth pack, or NI Massive." Mac also operated a mini keyboard which was used for loops during "[breaks] between songs."

When asked what front of house sound Lorde wanted on stage, Philip Harvey mentioned that she opted to have a "big, loud and dynamic" audio for her set. Drummer Ben Barter was responsible for activating samples on a Roland SPD, an electronic drum percussion instrument. His set included a variety of microphones such as the Shure SM52A, a Sennheiser e904, two overhead AKG C414 microphones, a Shure SM81 microphone for hi-hat drums as well as a Shure SM57 for snare drums. The public address system (PAS) uses the JBL Vertec VT4889, 18 floor-stacked subwoofers, a Shure UR Wireless Microphone System, a Sennheiser G3 IEM as well as Dolby Lake Processors. Harvey also mentioned that the use of auxiliary send through various instruments at low information helped to modify the aux master for each song.

Harvey said that Lorde was not partial to selecting microphones so they tried several to see which would complement her vocal range. They tried a Telefunken M80, a Sennheiser MD431, and a Heil PR35 microphone with no success. However, Harvey said that during European promotional tours, Lorde used the Shure Beta58. She also opted to have the level of her backing vocals match her vocals live onstage. Brett Taylor, a monitor engineer, called Lorde's in-ear mix "idiosyncratic", saying it is rare when singers chose to display their vocals "almost underneath the backing vocal tracks." Lorde and her band use Sensaphonic in-ear monitors; her band also utilizes d&b M2 floor monitors.

Concert synopsis

The show was divided into three parts. The main show began with Lorde standing behind a black curtain, with one white spotlight and a faint chandelier onstage as she performed "Glory and Gore". Various light fixtures and Lorde's touring band were unveiled; the band consisted of Jimmy Mac, a DJ and keyboardist, as well as Ben Barter, a drummer. Lorde performed idiosyncratic dance moves as lights flickered and faded throughout the stage. She wore an oversized suit with a white tank top. The black curtain dropped to reveal a scarcely decorated set during "Biting Down"; three picture frames hung overhead. Her performance was accompanied by freeing dance routines.

During "Tennis Court", smoke and green light illuminated the stage; a video of boys playing a rugby match in the rain was shown in the background. The next song "Buzzcut Season" showcased another video documenting Lorde as she walked on a Devonport, New Zealand, pier and looked at the city's street lights. The stage was set in shades of blue. Before introducing "Still Sane", Lorde briefly mentioned her tour visuals, all filmed in Auckland, saying, "I've taken these places with me all around the world, all through America. And it's felt so comforting to have you on stage with me in a way every night." For "Swingin Party", a mirrored projection was shown to the audience. A background video depicting a neighborhood was shown on "400 Lux"; the video features locations such as the Victoria Park Tunnel. She introduced "Ribs" with a short monologue on the inspiration for the song; it was written during the month of February 2013 after she and her sister threw a party. She also cites her fear of aging as inspiration.

Lorde changed into a white pant suit, a crop top, and a coat before covering Kanye West's 2013 song "Hold My Liquor". The performance was followed by another costume change: a red outfit with a gold crown and cape. A chandelier lit the stage in gold colors and crown images were shown in the background during "Royals". A marquee that read, "Tonight: The Tragic and Wonderful Triumphal Procession of Lorde" was displayed. Another costume change, a metallic jumpsuit and a full-length cape, accompanied "Team". Different coloured spotlights shone throughout the set. An extended instrumental played as Lorde went offstage; Lorde returned with a gold robe as confetti cannons erupted.

Reception

The Pure Heroine Tour was met with critical acclaim, with critics complimenting the singer's vocal clarity and stage presence as well as the minimalist stage setting. Brittany Spanos, writing for The Village Voice, placed the New York show on her list of the 10 Best Concerts in New York for the week of 30 September 2013. Davis Inman of American Songwriter called her Lollapalooza set in Chicago one of the highlights of the festival; her set received positive reviews from other publications, including Billboard and Rolling Stone, the latter deemed it the best segment of the Chicago event.

Kitty Empire of The Guardian gave a four out of five-star review of the concert at Shepherd's Bush Empire in London, writing that "dramatic visuals and a daring reworking of her songs see the teenage star in dazzling form". The Washington Posts Chris Richards described the minimalist setup of Lorde's backing duo as "highly efficient"; their setup was compared to English downtempo musician James Blake. Rachel Bache of The New Zealand Herald commented on Lorde's improved stage presence and enhanced vocal ability as well, stating that she "returned to her home town with a newfound boldness." PopMatterss William Carl Ferleman reviewed The Midland concert in Kansas City positively, stating that "it italicized an emerging artist who can solidly deliver her songs within a live setting" with few mistakes.

Writing for The Hollywood Reporter, Ashley Lee gave a positive review of the Roseland Ballroom concert in New York, calling it an "intimate introduction and joyful celebration of the textured alto singer and her troubled lyrics" though Lee had an ambivalent reaction to her obscure presence. Los Angeles Times writer August Brown gave a positive review of the Greek Theatre concert in Los Angeles, commending Lorde for "casting off the limits pop loves to put on young women and ... making full use of her talents and energy and these wide new stages." However, Brown was critical of her extended monologues and the "mock-film-marquee billboard" during her performance of "Royals". Foster Kamer of Complex called her Brooklyn concert an "impressive, charismatic performance that shows Lorde already outgrowing her material" though he had mixed reactions towards "muddy vocal mixes" and backing tracks.

Opening acts
 Nick Mulvey (Europe)
 Until the Ribbon Breaks (North America)
 Lo-Fang (North America)
 Majical Cloudz (North America)
 Doprah (Oceania)
 Oliver Tank (Oceania)
 Safia (Oceania)
 Yumi Zouma (Oceania)

Set list
This setlist is from the show on 18 March 2014. It does not represent all the concerts during the tour. Lorde changed the covers as the tour progressed, including Kanye West's "Flashing Lights" and "Hold My Liquor" as well as Bon Iver's "Heavenly Father".
 	
	
"Glory and Gore"
"Biting Down"
"Tennis Court"
"White Teeth Teens"
"Buzzcut Season"
"Swingin Party" (The Replacements cover)
"Still Sane"	
"400 Lux"
"Bravado"
"Easy" (Son Lux cover)
"Ribs"
"Royals"
"Team"
"A World Alone"

Tour dates

Postponed shows

References

Notes

Citations

External links
Official website

2013 concert tours
2014 concert tours
Lorde concert tours